Thornton Village Historic District is a national historic district in Thornbury Township, Delaware County, Pennsylvania. Located in the crossroads village of Thornton at the intersection of Glen Mills and Thornton Roads, the district includes 13 contributing buildings   built between 1750 and 1855, some in the Federal style. Among its structures, most of which face Glen Mills Road, are the Yellow House, one commercial building, seven residences, a converted blacksmith shop, a converted barn, three stables or carriage houses, and two frame sheds.

It was added to the National Register of Historic Places in 2006.

Yellow House
Over the years, the Yellow House has served as tavern, post office, general store, grocery, textile factory, and hair salon.

The Yellow House opened as an inn and tavern about 1750; the surrounding village was known by the same name until it changed to Thornton.   The Yellow House was originally owned by George Pearce.  One of the important clients of the Yellow House Inn was George Gray, owner of Gray's Ferry over the Schuylkill River in Philadelphia.  As the American Revolution proceeded, Gray moved his family away from Philadelphia to avoid the impending British Army occupation. Yet Gray's family could hear cannons during the Battle of Brandywine on September 11, 1777, and fleeing Continental Army troops came down the road right in front of the Yellow House.  Gray's wife treated wounded soldiers in the Yellow House and later a group of Virginia soldiers signed a note of appreciation for her efforts.

In 1800, Thomas Charlton set up a hand loom in the Yellow House to make linen.

John King established the Thornton Post Office in the Yellow House in 1829.  One of the first in its county not located on a post road, the Thornton Post Office is thought to be the oldest U.S. post office still in its original building.

In 1845, the Yellow House was purchased by William D. Pennell at a bankruptcy auction.

Isaac Pyle House
The Isaac Pyle House, a stone example of the Penn Plan, was built around 1777.

Caleb Hoopes House
The Caleb Hoopes House is a two-story, four-bay building built about 1790.

Blacksmith House
Built by Joseph Moore around 1805, this two-story, four-bay building reflects a style often referred to as "Pennsylvania Farmhouse".

Beebe House
George Beebe replaced his log cabin with this house, built about 1851 to a similar plan as the Blacksmith House.

William D. Pennell House
This Gothic Revival-style house was built around 1850.

References

Historic districts on the National Register of Historic Places in Pennsylvania
Federal architecture in Pennsylvania
Historic districts in Delaware County, Pennsylvania
National Register of Historic Places in Delaware County, Pennsylvania